Profundimitra is a genus of sea snails, marine gastropod mollusks in the subfamily Mitrinae of the family Mitridae.

Species
Species within the genus Profundimitra include:
 Profundimitra abyssicola (Schepman, 1911)
 Profundimitra kuoi S.-I Huang & Q.-Y. Chuo, 2019
 † Profundimitra lacuiensis S. N. Nielsen & Ampuero, 2020 
 Profundimitra planofilum (S.-I Huang, 2011)
 Profundimitra taylori Fedosov, Herrmann, Kantor & Bouchet, 2018

References

External links
 Fedosov A., Puillandre N., Herrmann M., Kantor Yu., Oliverio M., Dgebuadze P., Modica M.V. & Bouchet P. (2018). The collapse of Mitra: molecular systematics and morphology of the Mitridae (Gastropoda: Neogastropoda). Zoological Journal of the Linnean Society. 183(2): 253-337

 
Mitridae
Gastropod genera